Starbridge might refer to one of the following:

 Orbiting skyhooks, an orbiting tether space transportation system
a space elevator (a similar term is space bridge)
a spaceship from the Ambrosia Software computer game Escape Velocity Nova
The Starbridge Series, a book series written by Susan Howatch
The StarBridge series, a book series written by Ann C. Crispin
Starbridge Networks, a midget company based in Weston, Florida  "founded in 2003 to develop and provide ... solutions for Telecom Operators and Internet Service Providers in selected countries", but providing no support to end customers.